Meg Rosoff (born 16 October 1956) is an American writer based in London, United Kingdom. She is best known for the novel How I Live Now (Puffin, 2004), which won the Guardian Prize, Printz Award, and Branford Boase Award and made the Whitbread Awards shortlist. Her second novel, Just in Case (Penguin, 2006), won the annual Carnegie Medal from the British librarians recognising the year's best children's book published in the UK.

Early life and education
Rosoff was born in Boston, Massachusetts, in 1956, into a Jewish family, the second of four sisters.  She attended Harvard University from 1974-1977, then moved to London and studied sculpture at Saint Martin's School of Art. She returned to the United States to finish her degree in 1980, and later moved to New York City for 9 years, where she worked in publishing and advertising.

Career
In 1989, at the age of 32 Rosoff returned to London and has lived there ever since. Between 1989 and 2003, she worked for a variety of advertising agencies as a copywriter.  She began to write novels after her youngest sister died of breast cancer. Her young-adult novel How I Live Now was published in 2004, in the same week she was diagnosed with breast cancer. It won the annual Guardian Children's Fiction Prize, and the annual Michael L. Printz Award from the American Library Association, recognising the year's "best book written for teens, based entirely on its literary merit". In 2005 she published a children's book, Meet Wild Boars, which was illustrated by Sophie Blackall. Just in Case, published in 2006, won the British Carnegie Medal and German Jugendliteraturpreis. What I Was, Rosoff's third novel, was published in August 2007, followed by two more collaborations with Blackall:  Wild Boars Cook and Jumpy Jack and Googily. Another novel, The Brides Farewell, was named one of 2009's ten best books for young adults that were published in the American adult market.

There Is No Dog, published by Penguin in 2011 (US edition, Putnam, 2012) is a comic novel supposing that God is a 19-year-old boy. Rosoff told Book Nerd, "The title comes from a joke about a dyslexic atheist walking up and down in front of a church with a sign that reads THERE IS NO DOG."

Picture Me Gone was a finalist for the 2013 National Book Award for Young People's Literature (U.S.).

The film of How I Live Now directed by Kevin MacDonald and starring Saoirse Ronan opened in Britain on 4 October 2013 and in America and Canada on 5 November 2013.

In 2016, Rosoff won the Astrid Lindgren memorial award and the largest cash prize in children's literature for her entire catalog of work.

Bibliography

Picture books
Meet Wild Boars, illustrated by Sophie Blackall (2005)
Jumpy Jack and Googily, illustrated by Sophie Blackall (2008)
Wild Boars Cook, illustrated by Sophie Blackall (2010)
It's A Moose!", illustrated by David Ercolini (2020)

Middle Grade BooksGood Dog, McTavish, illustrated by Grace Easton (2017)McTavish Goes Wild, illustrated by Grace Easton (2018)McTavish Takes The Biscuit, illustrated by Grace Easton (2019)McTavish On The Move, illustrated by Grace Easton and David Shephard (2020)

Novels
 How I Live Now (2004)
 Just in Case (2006)
 What I Was (2007)
 The Bride's Farewell (2009)
 Moose Baby (originally Vamoose) (2010) 
 There Is No Dog (2011)
 Picture Me Gone (2013)
 Jonathan Unleashed (2016)
 The Great Godden (2020)
 Friends Like These (2022)

Non-fiction
 London Guide: your passport to great travel'' (Washington: Open Road, 1995), by Rosoff & Caren Acker

Honors

Lifetime achievement honors and awards
Fellow of the Royal Society of Literature (2014)
Astrid Lindgren Memorial Award (2016)
Fellow of Homerton College, Cambridge

Individual book awards

How I Live Now
 2004 Guardian Children's Fiction Prize
 2005 Michael L. Printz Award (US)
 2005 Branford Boase Award (first novel)
 2005 Der Luchs des Jahres
 Finalist for 2005 LA Times Book Prize
 Finalist 2005 Whitbread Children's Book Award
 Finalist 2005 Orange First Novel prize 
 Finalist 2006 Deutscher Jugendliteraturpreis

Just In Case
 2007  Carnegie Medal
 2008  Deutscher Jugendliteraturpreis
 Finalist 2007 LA Times Book Prize
 Finalist 2007 Booktrust Teenage Prize
 Finalist 2007 Costa Book Award

What I Was
 2009 Der Luchs des Jahres
 Finalist 2008 Carnegie Medal 
 Finalist 2008 Costa Book Award
 Finalist 2009 New Angle Prize

The Bride's Farewell
 2010 Alex Award
 Finalist 2011 Carnegie Medal

Picture Me Gone 
 Finalist 2013 U.S. National Book Award

Good Dog McTavish 
 Winner 2020 Premio Letteratura Ragazzi Prize

The Great Godden 
 Finalist 2020 Costa Awards 
Winner 2021 Orbil prize (awarded by the Italian association of independent bookshops)
YA Book Prize finalist 2021
School Reading List book of the month June 2020

References

External links 
 
 Meg Rosoff at Macmillan
  Meg Rosoff at Fantasticfiction
 Sophie Blackall Illustration
 Meg Rosoff Author Interview at Jean Book Nerd (February 2012)

 

1956 births
Living people
Writers from Boston
American children's writers
Jewish American writers
Jewish women writers
Alumni of Saint Martin's School of Art
Harvard University alumni
Carnegie Medal in Literature winners
Guardian Children's Fiction Prize winners
Michael L. Printz Award winners
Astrid Lindgren Memorial Award winners
Fellows of the Royal Society of Literature
American women children's writers
Women writers of young adult literature
American expatriates in England
Writers from London
21st-century American novelists
21st-century American women writers
Novelists from Massachusetts